Interstate 540 (I-540) and North Carolina Highway 540 (NC 540) are part of a partially completed beltway around the city of Raleigh in the US state of North Carolina, forming the Raleigh Outer Loop. When complete, the route will completely encircle the city, meeting its parent route of I-40 in two locations.

The initial phase of construction is designated I-540 and was completed in January 2007. It runs from I-40 near the Raleigh–Durham International Airport to I-87/U.S. Highway 64 (US 64)/US 264 south of Knightdale. The original plan was for the entire route to be designated as part of the Interstate Highway System, possibly renumbering the route to I-640 when the beltway was complete. When it became financially unfeasible to construct the entire route with public funds within a reasonable timeframe, it was decided that the remaining portion of the route (approximately two-thirds of the total completed mileage) would be constructed as a toll road and designated as a North Carolina highway rather than an Interstate Highway. The tolled portion is known as the Triangle Expressway. The first section of NC 540 was opened in July 2007, extending westward from the western terminus of I-540. Further extensions have carried NC 540 around the western side of Wake County to its current southwestern terminus south of Apex. Future projects are planned to complete the southern leg, from Apex to Garner, and eastern leg, from Garner to Knightdale, under the same toll system. In particular, the portion south of Garner has been held up due to conflicting interests in choosing a path for the route. The southern extension is currently under construction and is expected to be completed in late 2023. Construction on the eastern extension is projected to begin sometime between 2026–2029 with a completion date of three to five years later.

Route description
When completed, the beltway will total  in length, surrounding the city of Raleigh and the towns of Apex, Cary, Garner, and Morrisville. The designation from I-540 and NC 540 happens at I-40, in Durham County, where I-540 goes east and NC 540 goes west.

The beltway is further broken down into four segments:

Interstate 540
The I-540 portion begins at an interchange designated as exit 1 near I-40 (I-40 exit 283B) near the Raleigh–Durham International Airport, located right at the Durham–Wake county line. It travels northeast to Aviation Parkway (exit 2), then turns east along the southside of the Brier Creek neighborhood, with interchanges at Lumley Road (exit 3) and US 70 (exit 4). After crossing US 70, I-540 travels eastward across the mostly residential areas of North Raleigh, with several exits with major arterial roads, including Leesville Road (exit 7), NC 50/Creedmoor Road (exit 9), Six Forks Road (exit 11), and Falls of Neuse Road (exit 14). Turning southeast, there is a complex interchange with US 1/Capital Boulevard (exit 16) and Triangle Town Boulevard (exit 17), which provide access to the Triangle Town Center shopping mall and commercial district along Capital Boulevard. Shortly after the interchange with US 401/Louisburg Road (exit 18), I-540 crosses the Neuse River and then turns south towards Knightdale. I-540 immediately has an interchange with Buffaloe Road (exit 20). I-540 continues south paralleling both the Neuse River and Forestville Road. As I-540 enters Knightdale, it has an interchange with U.S. Highway 64 Business (US 64 Bus.)/Knightdale Boulevard (exit 24). About  after the US 64 Bus. interchange, I-540 has its western terminus at I-87/US 64/US 264 (exit 26), though the roadway continues on for a short distance, and several ghost ramps indicate the planned connection to the rest of the loop.

North Carolina Highway 540
NC 540 is the designation given to the Western Wake Expressway and future Southern Wake Expressway and Eastern Wake Expressway. The Western Wake Expressway also forms a portion of the Triangle Expressway toll road complex. The current terminus is at NC 55 just south of Apex at exit 54. At this point, the road is heading due west and has two quick interchanges with Veridea Road (exit 55) and US 1 (exit 56) after turning to the northwest. Exit 56 connects to Salem Street, connecting to downtown Apex, while exit 59 connects to US 64 near the Beaver Creek Shopping Center. Now heading due north and between Green Level Church Road (to the west) and NC 55 (to the east), the road skirts the western edge of Cary, with interchanges at Green Level Road (exit 62) and Morrisville Parkway (exit 64). Just north of the former community of Carpenter (since annexed by Cary) is a second interchange with NC 55 (exit 66). The Triangle Expressway toll road leaves NC 540 at exit 67 to follow NC 885, leaving a short free segment of NC 540 to connect to I-540, along which there is a single interchange with NC 54 (exit 69) before meeting I-40 at exit 1 and continuing on as I-540.

Tolls

No portion of I-540 is tolled. All of NC 540 is tolled except the short segment between I-40 and NC 54. Tolls are implemented by electronic toll collection (ETC) and are enforced by video cameras. Several gantries are located along the route and entrance/exit ramps, where they collect toll via the NC Quick Pass or other interoperable ETC systems. Those that do not participate in the ETC program will receive a bill in the mail and will have 30 days from the date on said bill before additional fees and civil penalties are applied.

History

Planning for the highway originally started in the early 1970s; by 1976, the "Northern Wake Expressway" was added to the planning map. In the mid-1980s, realizing that the growth in western Wake County may require more roads than planned, highway planners decided to expand the project as a new beltway around Raleigh. In 1992, construction began on the first  section of the Northern Wake Expressway, connecting I-40 with US 70. On January 21, 1997, the freeway opened as I-540.

In the following 10 years, the now known Northern Wake Freeway (so not to be confused with the Triangle Expressway) made several extensions:
 December 11, 1999: From US 70/Glenwood Avenue (exit 4) to Leesville Road (exit 7).
 December 21, 2000: From Leesville Road (exit 7) to NC 50/Creedmoor Road (exit 9).
 June 29, 2001: From NC 50/Creedmoor Road (exit 9) to Falls of Neuse Road (exit 14).
 August 12, 2002: From Falls of Neuse Road (exit 14) to US 1/Capital Boulevard/Triangle Town Boulevard (exit 16).
 January 16, 2007: From Triangle Town Boulevard (exit 17) to US 64/US 264/Knightdale Bypass (exit 26).

From 1999 to 2002, each additional section of the freeway was designated as Future 540, until it connected with US 1.

On July 14, 2007, a section of the loop from I-40 west to NC 54 and NC 55 was opened. However, the route is signed not as I-540 but as NC 540. Officials decided to change the designation in early July at the urging of the North Carolina Turnpike Authority (NCTA). Work on the western and southern portions of the beltway, if paid for by state funds, would possibly not open until 2030. At the request of several Wake County mayors, the NCTA in 2006 began studying the use of tolls to complete these portions of the Outer Loop.

The Authority concluded in early 2007 that it would be financially feasible to build the western section (along with an extended Durham Freeway, which combined would be called the "Triangle Expressway") using toll funds. The NCTA apparently never wanted an Interstate designation for the Western Wake Parkway. To lessen motorist confusion about where I-540 ended, the route was truncated to the I-40 interchange. All I-540 signs that were put up along the unopened stretch between I-40 and NC 55 were taken down in early July 2007; the new section is now signed as NC 540. (In addition, I-540 as a completed loop would violate the Interstate numbering convention regarding three-digit routes, as spurs begin with an odd number and loops with an even number, and, at one point, I-640—the last remaining available number within the state, as I-240, I-440, and I-840 are already taken—was proposed for the loop.)

Work to build the Western Wake Freeway, which would be renamed the "Western Wake Parkway" under the toll proposal, began August 12, 2009, with the Triangle Parkway portion opening in December 2011, and Western Wake portion scheduled to open in two phases in 2012.

In October 2008, the authority was unable to issue bonds to fund the Western Wake Turnpike project as planned due to market conditions affecting municipal bonds such as those. On July 29, 2009, the Authority closed on a revised $1.01-billion (equivalent to $ in ) bond plan, consisting of $270 million (equivalent to $ in ) in toll revenue bonds, $353 million (equivalent to $ in ) in Build America Bonds, and a $387-million (equivalent to $ in ) loan from the US Department of Transportation under the Transportation Infrastructure Finance and Innovation Act.

Groundbreaking was held on August 12, 2009, at the west end of I-540. "A dozen dignitaries" used shovels painted gold as 150 watched.

After work began on Western Wake Parkway in 2009, engineering and environmental studies began a year later for the Southern and Eastern Wake Freeways, also known as the Triangle Expressway Southeast Extension. Construction would begin in 2014 and be completed by 2019; however, it was delayed in March 2011 by the enactment of North Carolina Session Law 2011-7 (N.C. S.L. 2011-7), which forbade the North Carolina Department of Transportation (NCDOT) to consider a few alternative routes.

In 2010, NCDOT made an interchange improvement at I-540/I-40, adding another auxiliary lane from I-540 south to I-40 west at a cost of $4.8 million (equivalent to $ in ).

The completed Triangle Parkway, the first section of the Triangle Expressway, with its connection to NC 540, opened on December 8, 2011, reestablishing exit 67. Collection of tolls began on January 3, 2012. On August 1, 2012, the first phase of the Western Wake Freeway opened, connecting NC 55 in Morrisville (exit 66) to US 64 in Apex. The next day tolling began on the previously open section from NC 54 to NC 55. The final phase of the tolled section of NC 540, from US 64 to NC 55 north of Holly Springs, opened on December 20, 2012. Tolling for this section began January 2, 2013. On April 3, 2017, the Veridea Parkway interchange (exit 55; formally known as Old Holly Springs Apex Road) was opened to traffic. At a cost of $20 million (equivalent to $ in ), it was constructed by Blythe Construction and Kimley-Horn. An interchange with the newly extended Morrisville Parkway (exit 64) opened to traffic on February 3, 2020.

Future
A plan approved by the Raleigh city council in November 2013 includes asking for tolls for the existing highway in order to widen it to eight lanes by 2035 or 2040. This would require both state and federal approval. As a temporary solution to increased traffic on the northern section, NCDOT has installed ramp meters on some onramps, the first ones in the state.

Triangle Expressway Southeast Extension

The Southern Wake Expressway will connect Holly Springs with Garner. The route for the southern leg, known as the Orange Route, has been protected from development by NCDOT since the 1990s, but it would cross habitat for the endangered dwarf wedgemussel. The US Fish and Wildlife Service asked for routes north of the Orange Route to be considered as a way to provide a shorter option, possibly minimizing impacts to natural resources. In September 2010, a new map showed several other routes, including the controversial Red Route, which many Garner-area residents protested in a December 2010 meeting; a total of 3,000 signatures on petitions opposed the route as well.

After two years, the General Assembly chose to permit studying the Red Corridor, which meant possible routes could once again be considered. Documents released on September 9, 2013, changed the  project from two phases to a single project, with construction expected to begin in 2018 and be completed by 2022. Public meetings were scheduled in October 2013 for "Complete 540".

In April 2016, NCDOT announced that Detailed Study Alternative 2 was selected as the preferred alternative for the project. The route goes from west to east and combines the proposed orange, green (southern portion), mint, and green (northern portion) corridor segments. As of August 21, 2021, the NC 540 from NC 55 to I-40 is scheduled to be open to traffic in 2023, with the final segment closing the loop to I-87/US 64/US 264 scheduled to begin the bidding process in 2029.

Exit list

References

External links

 
 
 I-540 on Wake County Roads
 NCRoads.com: I-540
 NCRoads.com: N.C. 540

40-5 North Carolina
40-5
540
540
5 (North Carolina)
Transportation in Durham County, North Carolina
Transportation in Wake County, North Carolina
Transportation in Raleigh, North Carolina